In mathematics, a multiplicative cascade is a fractal/multifractal distribution of points produced via an iterative and multiplicative random process.

Definition

The plots above are examples of multiplicative cascade multifractals.

To create these distributions there are a few steps to take. Firstly, we must create a lattice of cells which will be our underlying probability density field. 

Secondly, an iterative process is followed to create multiple levels of the lattice: at each iteration the cells are split into four equal parts (cells). Each new cell is then assigned a probability randomly from the set  without replacement, where . This process is continued to the Nth level. For example, in constructing such a model down to level 8 we produce a 48 array of cells. 

Thirdly, the cells are filled as follows: We take the probability of a cell being occupied as the product of the cell's own pi and those of all its parents (up to level 1). A Monte Carlo rejection scheme is used repeatedly until the desired cell population is obtained, as follows: x and y cell coordinates are chosen randomly, and a random number between 0 and 1 is assigned; the (x, y) cell is then populated depending on whether the assigned number is lesser than (outcome: not populated) or greater or equal to (outcome: populated) the cell's occupation probability.

Examples

To produce the plots above we filled the probability density field with 5,000 points in a space of 256 × 256.

An example of the probability density field:

The fractals are generally not scale-invariant and therefore cannot be considered standard  fractals. They can however be considered multifractals. The Rényi (generalized) dimensions can be theoretically predicted.

 

where N is the level of the grid refinement and,

See also 

 Fractal dimension
 Hausdorff dimension
 Scale invariance

References

Fractals